Pitcairnia fusca is a species of plant in the family Bromeliaceae. It is endemic to Ecuador.  Its natural habitat is subtropical or tropical moist montane forests.

References

Flora of Ecuador
fusca
Least concern plants
Taxonomy articles created by Polbot